Love, Linda: The Life Of Mrs. Cole Porter is a studio album by jazz vocalist Stevie Holland. It is Holland’s seventh album and was released by 150 Music on February 9, 2010, and re-issued September 24, 2018, with new material. It is the original cast recording from the Off-Broadway musical Love, Linda: The Life Of Mrs. Cole Porter.

Track listing

Personnel
 Tim Peierls - Gary William Friedman and Stevie Holland, producers
 Gary William Friedman - arrangements
 Landon Knoblock - piano
 Deniz Cordell - piano
 Peter Brendler - bass
 Jeff Davis - drums

References

2018 albums
Stevie Holland albums